Karoro is a suburb to the south-west of Greymouth on the West Coast of New Zealand.

Demographics

Karoro had a population of 1,017 at the 2018 New Zealand census, a decrease of 36 people (-3.4%) since the 2013 census, and an increase of 9 people (0.9%) since the 2006 census. There were 408 households. There were 510 males and 507 females, giving a sex ratio of 1.01 males per female. The median age was 47.1 years (compared with 37.4 years nationally), with 177 people (17.4%) aged under 15 years, 138 (13.6%) aged 15 to 29, 480 (47.2%) aged 30 to 64, and 225 (22.1%) aged 65 or older.

Ethnicities were 92.6% European/Pākehā, 6.8% Māori, 0.6% Pacific peoples, 2.7% Asian, and 2.4% other ethnicities (totals add to more than 100% since people could identify with multiple ethnicities).

The proportion of people born overseas was 11.8%, compared with 27.1% nationally.

Although some people objected to giving their religion, 46.6% had no religion, 43.7% were Christian, 0.9% were Hindu, 0.3% were Buddhist and 1.2% had other religions.

Of those at least 15 years old, 123 (14.6%) people had a bachelor or higher degree, and 186 (22.1%) people had no formal qualifications. The median income was $37,000, compared with $31,800 nationally. The employment status of those at least 15 was that 468 (55.7%) people were employed full-time, 120 (14.3%) were part-time, and 15 (1.8%) were unemployed.

Education
Karoro School is a coeducational full primary (years 1–8) school with a roll of  students as of  The school celebrated its 50th jubilee in 2008.

References

Grey District
Suburbs of Greymouth
Populated places in the West Coast, New Zealand